Library Park or Library Park Historic District may refer to:

Brazil
Manguinhos Library Park, library and park complex in Rio de Janeiro, Brazil

Colombia 
Library park (Colombia), libraries with park and public spaces constructed in Medellin, Colombia as part of cultural development efforts and to promote education in underprivileged areas

United States 
(by state)
Phoenix Carnegie Library and Library Park, Phoenix, Arizona, listed on the NRHP in Phoenix, Arizona
Library Park Historic District (Las Vegas, New Mexico), listed on the NRHP in San Miguel County, New Mexico
Library Park Historic District (Ogdensburg, New York), listed on the NRHP in New York
 Library Park (Belleville, Wisconsin), listed on the NRHP in Dane County, Wisconsin
 Library Park (Kenosha, Wisconsin), listed on the NRHP in Kenosha County, Wisconsin
Library Park Historic District (Kenosha, Wisconsin), listed on the NRHP in Kenosha County, Wisconsin